The Taifa of Morón was a medieval Berber taifa kingdom that existed from around 1010 to 1066. From 1066 until 1091 it was under the forcible control of Seville, by Abbad II al-Mu'tadid.

List of Emirs

Dammarid dynasty
Abu Tuziri al-Dammari: ?–1013/4
Nuh: 1013/4–1041/2
Muhammad: 1041/2–1057
Manad: 1057–1066

See also
 List of Sunni Muslim dynasties

References

Berber dynasties
1066 disestablishments
States and territories established in 1010
Moron